The renal branches of vagus nerve are small branches which provide parasympathetic innervation to the kidney.

See also
 Renal plexus

Vagus nerve
Nerves of the torso
Kidney